Catherine Bouroche (21 May 1942 – 11 December 2015) was a French sculptor.

Biography 
Catherine Bouroche was born in Casteljaloux, Lot-et-Garonne on May 21, 1942. She graduated from  the École nationale supérieure des arts appliqués et des métiers d'art in Paris in 1964. She started her career as a sculptor in 1992. She presented his works in various salons such as Salon de Mai, the Young Sculptors and Salon de Montrouge.

Selected solo exhibitions 
 2011 : Galerie Toutes latitudes, Vincennes.
 2006 : Galerie Toutes latitudes, Vincennes.
 2003 : mac2000/macparis, Fresnes, France.
 1999 : Reims habitat, Reims, France
 1998 : Galerie Delfi Form, Zwolle, Netherlands
 1996 : Galerie Babel, Amsterdam, Netherlands.

References

1942 births
20th-century French sculptors
21st-century French sculptors
French contemporary artists
Deaths in Paris
2015 deaths